Lorrenzo Wade (born November 23, 1985) is an American professional basketball player who last played for the Delaware 87ers of the NBA Development League. He is former collegiate basketball player for the Louisville Cardinals and San Diego State Aztecs basketball teams.

High school career
Lorrenzo Wade went to high school at Cheyenne High School, North Las Vegas, Nevada. There he averaged 14 points and 4 rebounds in 2001–02 and had a 30-5 record and was a state runner-up. In 2003, he was in the first-team all-state, all-region and all-division selection. Wade was named co-MVP of the 2003 state tournament where he averaged 21.5 points in six postseason games helping Cheyenne to its first-ever state title. He scored 20 points and had 22 rebounds in the state title game after recording 22 points and 14 rebounds in the semifinals. In 2002–03 they had compiled a record of 31-1. Wade played his prep season of high school basketball at Hargrave Military Academy in Virginia and averaged 14.3 points. He led his team to a 25-1 1 record and won the prep national championship.

Collegiate career

2004–05

Wade was part of a Louisville team that went to the Final Four, as Wade appeared in 31 games, averaging 3.9 points per game in 10 mins per outing. Wade's best game of the season came against Tennessee State when Wade scored a then-career-high 14 points on January 2, 2005, on 5-of-8 shooting.

2005–06

Wade made the decision transfer to San Diego State following his freshman year, and as per NCAA regulations, was forced to sit out for the entire season.

2006–07

Wade started 24 of 33 games in his first season with the Aztecs, and his 10.5 points and 5.3 rebounds per game garnered him an Honorable mention to the all-Mountain West Conference team. In a loss to Syracuse in the second round of the NIT, Wade scored 16 points and notched eight rebounds in an 80-64 loss.

2007–08

Wade enjoyed his best season to date, averaging 14.8 points (lead team) and 3.6 (lead team) assists per game, as he was named to the first-team all-Mountain West Conference team. Wade's best game of the season included a career-high 28 points against BYU on February 23, 2008.

College Statistics

Professional career
On March 19, 2010, Wade signed with Purefoods Tender Juicy Giants of the Philippines.

On October 29, 2016, Wade was acquired by the Delaware 87ers of the NBA Development League. On December 31, he was waived by Delaware. In 15 games, he averaged 11.7 points, 4.1 rebounds, 1.3 assists and 1.2 steals in 28.1 minutes.

References

External links
Profile at San Diego Aztecs Official Page
Eurobasket.com profile

1985 births
Living people
Abejas de León players
American expatriate basketball people in Argentina
American expatriate basketball people in Greece
American expatriate basketball people in Israel
American expatriate basketball people in Mexico
American expatriate basketball people in the Philippines
American expatriate basketball people in Venezuela
American men's basketball players
Basketball players from Nevada
Capitanes de Ciudad de México players
Delaware 87ers players
Greek Basket League players
Juventud Sionista basketball players
Kavala B.C. players
Lanús basketball players
Louisville Cardinals men's basketball players
Magnolia Hotshots players
People from North Las Vegas, Nevada
Philippine Basketball Association imports
Rayos de Hermosillo players
San Diego State Aztecs men's basketball players
Shooting guards
Small forwards
Soles de Mexicali players
Sportspeople from the Las Vegas Valley
Toros de Nuevo Laredo players
Hargrave Military Academy alumni